Tony Jerod-Eddie (born March 29, 1990) is a former American football nose tackle. He signed with the San Francisco 49ers as an undrafted free agent in 2012. He played college football at Texas A&M.

Early years
Jerod-Eddie attended DeSoto High School in DeSoto, Texas. He was a two-time first-team all-district defensive line and was selected for the Honorable Mention 5A All-State honors.

College career
Jerod-Eddie was an honorable mention All-Big 12 after his Junior season. He finished college with 147 tackles, 7 sacks, 5 pass deflections, and a forced fumble. He became popular on YouTube when a video surfaced of him grabbing another guy's balls during a fumble recovery.

Professional career
On May 4, 2012, Jerod-Eddie signed with the San Francisco 49ers as an undrafted free agent. On August 31, 2012, he was released. On September 1, 2012, he was signed to the San Francisco 49ers practice squad. On December 28, 2012, he was promoted to the active roster after the team placed wide receiver Mario Manningham on injured reserve.

On October 6, 2013, during a game against the Houston Texans, Jerod-Eddie came into the game in relief of 49ers starter Ray McDonald and recorded his first career interception off quarterback Matt Schaub. In the 2013 playoffs, he was credited with half a sack.

References

External links
 Texas A&M Aggies bio
 San Francisco 49ers bio

1990 births
Living people
American football defensive ends
Texas A&M Aggies football players
San Francisco 49ers players
Players of American football from Dallas